Mtwango is a town and ward in Njombe district in the Njombe Region of the Tanzanian Southern Highlands. Its population according to the 2002 Tanzanian census is 20,487.

References

Wards of Iringa Region